Henry Frankland (1690–1738) was an administrator of the English East India Company.

Frankland served as President of Bengal in the eighteenth century. He was a younger son of Sir Thomas Frankland, 2nd Baronet and Elizabeth Russell (through whom Frankland was a descendant of Oliver Cromwell) and was the father of Sir Charles Frankland, 4th Baronet, and Sir Thomas Frankland, 5th Baronet.

References

Presidents of Bengal
English businesspeople
British East India Company people
Henry
Younger sons of baronets
1690 births
1738 deaths